The Nossob (also Nosob or Nossop) River (ǂnuse ǃab, Khoikhoi for black river) is a dry river bed in eastern Namibia and the Kalahari region of South Africa and Botswana. It covers a distance of 740 km and last flooded in 1989. The river also lends its name to Nossob camp  in the Kgalagadi Transfrontier Park.

Course
The Nossob has its origin in two main tributaries, the Swart-Nossob and Wit-Nossob, meaning black and white respectively. Both tributaries have their origins in the eastern slopes of the Otjihavera mountain range, east of Windhoek. Their sources are at 1,800 m and over 2,000 m above sea level respectively. The two river beds have their confluence some 80 km south of Gobabis, which is situated on the bank of the Swart-Nossob.

From this confluence the river course passes the settlements of Leonardville and Aranos to arrive at Union's End, South Africa. From Union's End the river bed, forming the Botswana border, meanders through the Kgalagadi Transfrontier Park for a distance of over 200 km. It reaches the southern boundary of the game reserve just north of Twee Rivieren Camp, near its confluence with the Auob river.

In the Kalahari, the Nossob is said to flow about once a century. However, water does flow underground to provide life for grass and camelthorn trees growing in the river bed. The Nossob may flow briefly after large thunderstorms, causing wildlife to flock to the river.

The Nossob ends at a confluence with the Molopo River some 50 km south of Twee Rivieren. The Molopo is in turn a tributary of the Orange River, which it meets downstream of Augrabies Falls.

Dams

White Nossob
 Otjivero Dam, near the settlements of Otjivero and Omitara

Oanob River
The Oanob River, a tributary of the Auob River features two dams:
Nauspoort Dam
Oanob Dam

See also 
 Kgalagadi Transfrontier Park

Notes

External links
The Northern Ephemeral Rivers of the Orange-Senqu River Basin

Rivers of Namibia
Kalahari Desert
Rivers of Botswana
International rivers of Africa
Botswana–South Africa border
Rivers of the Northern Cape